The 94th Infantry Division (German: 94. Infanteriedivision) was a German Army infantry division in World War II.

History

Formation and the west campaign
The 94th Infantry Division was raised in September 1939 as part of the fifth wave from men of Military District number 4 (Wehrkreis 4), which comprised Saxony and Thuringia. The division was then sent to the Saarland in December, should the French invade. The division then aided the 6th Army in their border-crossing the following year. Following a fatal car collision in August 1940, General of the Infantry Hellmuth Volkmann was replaced by Major General Georg Pfeiffer.

The east campaign and destruction
In June 1941, the 94th Division attacked the Soviet Union with a large number of other German divisions. However; until October 1942, the 94th was assigned to the occupied Ukraine. In June 1942, Major General Pfeiffer was promoted to Lieutenant General. During the Case Blue offensive, the division was sent with the 6th Army as a component of LI Corps to capture the industrial Russian city of Stalingrad, which was considered important in crushing Soviet morale. 94th Infantry Division was cut off from supplies and reinforcements outside of Stalingrad, as a Soviet pincer-movement left the 6th Army surrounded.

The commander Lieutenant General Pfeiffer and his staff were flown out on December 11. The remnants of the 94th division surrendered in the last days of January 1943.

Recreation and surrender
The 94th was recreated later in 1943 and later moved to the Mediterranean, where the Allies opened up a new front in Italy. In Autumn 1944, remnants of the 95th Infantry and 278th Volksgrenadier Divisions were reconstituted as part of the 94th Infantry. The division surrendered on 22 April 1945.

War crimes
The division has been implicated in the San Polo massacre (Tuscany), on 14 July 1944, when 63 civilians were executed.

Order of battle

1942
267th Grenadier Regiment
274th Grenadier Regiment
276th Grenadier Regiment
194th Schnelle Abteilung
194th Artillery Regiment
194th Engineer Battalion
194th Signal Battalion
194th Supply Detachment

1943
267th Grenadier Regiment
274th Grenadier Regiment
276th Grenadier Regiment
194th Reconnaissance Battalion
194th Artillery Regiment
194th Engineer Battalion
194th Anti-tank Battalion
194th Signal Battalion
194th Field-replacement Battalion
194th Supply Detachment

Commanders 
General of the Infantry Hellmuth Volkmann (25 September 1939 – 21 August 1940)
General of the Artillery Georg Pfeiffer (21 August 1940 – 2 January 1944)
Lieutenant General Bernhard Steinmetz  (2 January 1944 – 22 April 1945)

References 

German units in Normandy
Military units and formations established in 1939
Military units and formations disestablished in 1945
0*094
1939 establishments in Germany